Now Phats What I Small Music is the debut album by Phats & Small, a house music production team from Brighton, England. It was released in 1999, and contains ten songs. "Turn Around" became the team's biggest hit when released as a single.

The album title is a pun based on the series of compilation albums titled Now That's What I Call Music!.

Track listing 
"Turn Around" – 3:33
"Music for Pushchairs" – 6:18
"Electro Roll" – 5:10
"Theme from Sauce" – 7:43
"Feel Good" – 3:25
"On da Flo Yo" – 3:38
"Let Your Hair Down" – 4:45
"Tonite" – 3:45
"Brighton Beach" – 5:51
"Turn Around (Live at BBC Radio 1 Dance Party)" - 4:58

Samples
"Turn Around" samples "Reach Up" by Toney Lee and "The Glow of Love" by Change.
"Feel Good" samples "Does It Feel Good" by B.T. Express.
"On da Flo Yo" samples "What About Me" by Chic.
"Tonite" samples "Heartache No. 9" by Delegation.

References

1999 debut albums
Phats & Small albums
Multiply Records albums